Kiswar (Quechua for Buddleja incana, also spelled Quisuar) is a mountain in the Cordillera Negra in the Andes of Peru which reaches a height of approximately . It lies in the Ancash Region, Recuay Province, on the border of the districts of Catac, Huayllapampa and Tapacocha.

References 

Mountains of Peru
Mountains of Ancash Region